HV Sittardia is a Dutch handball club in Sittard. The club was founded in 1949.

Sittardia is one of the most successful handball teams in Dutch handball history. They won the Dutch National Championship in 1966, 1968, 1969, 1970, 1971, 1972, 1973, 1974, 1975, 1976, 1977, 1979, 1987, 1990, 1993, 1994, 1997 and 1999. In 2007, they nearly became champion again, but they lost the finals against Volendam. The club has participated in European club team tournaments several times.

In 2008, Sittardia co-operated with V&L and HV BFC to form a stronger men's team. The project was called Tophandbal Zuid-Limburg and two team were formed: Limburg Lions and Limburg Wild Dogs (later turned into the second team of Limburg Lions). In 2016, the management of BFC decided to take no longer part in the collabation.

Accomplishments

Men
NHV Eredivisie: 
Winners (16) : 1966, 1968, 1969, 1970, 1971, 1972, 1973, 1974, 1975, 1976, 1979, 1987, 1993, 1994, 1997, 1999
Runner-Up (8) : 1980, 1983, 1984, 1986, 1995, 2000, 2001, 2007
Dutch Handball Cup: 
Winners (7) : 1979, 1980, 1981, 1984, 1995, 1997, 2001
Runner-Up (2) : 1987, 1992
Dutch Supercup: 
Winners (5) : 1992, 1994, 1995, 1997, 1999
Runner-Up (2) : 1993, 2001

Woman
Dutch Handball Cup: 
Runner-Up (2) : 1981, 1982

Former players 
 hencodejong

References

External links 
Sittardia Official Website

Dutch handball clubs
Sports clubs in Sittard-Geleen
1942 establishments in the Netherlands
Handball clubs established in 1942